Train d'enfer/Operation Double Cross is a 1965 Italian/French/Spanish international co-production spy film starring Jean Marais. Based on a novel by René Cambon, the film was directed by Gilles Grangier.

Plot
In Barcelona, secret agent Antoine Donadieu thwarts the plans of a Nazi scientist.

Cast
Jean Marais as Antoine Donadieu
Marisa Mell as Frieda
Howard Vernon as Le 'professeur'
Gérard Tichy as Matras 
Jean Lara
Léon Zitrone as himself

Popular culture
In the 2002 film, The Bourne Identity, Marie, in Jason's Paris apartment, wears a Train D'enfer shirt.

References

External links

1965 films
Italian spy films
French spy films
Spanish spy films
1960s Italian-language films
Films shot in Almería
1960s spy films
Films directed by Gilles Grangier
1960s Italian films
1960s French films